Ollie Phillips may refer to:

 Ollie Phillips (rugby union) (born 1983), rugby union player
 Ollie Phillips (Home and Away), a fictional character on the Australian soap opera Home And Away

Oliver Phillips may refer to:

 Oliver Phillips (ecologist), a British tropical ecologist